Urvan may refer to:
Nissan Urvan, a cargo van
 urvan, a concept of the soul in Zoroastrianism
Urvan, Azerbaijan, a village in Azerbaijan
 Michael Urvan, American gamer who was party to the sting.com domain name dispute